Mazouz Ben Djedaa (born 20 December 1967) is an Algerian wrestler. He competed in the men's Greco-Roman 68 kg at the 1992 Summer Olympics.

References

External links
 

1967 births
Living people
Algerian male sport wrestlers
Olympic wrestlers of Algeria
Wrestlers at the 1992 Summer Olympics
Place of birth missing (living people)
20th-century Algerian people